The 1926 United States Senate election in Oklahoma took place on November 2, 1926. Incumbent Republican Senator John W. Harreld ran for re-election to a second term. After facing many challengers in a crowded Republican primary, he advanced to the general election. In the Democratic primary, Congressman Elmer Thomas beat out a similarly crowded field, which included former Governor Jack C. Walton, to win his party's nomination with a plurality. In the general election, Thomas defeated Herrald in a landslide, winning his first of four terms in the U.S. Senate.

Democratic primary

Candidates
 Elmer Thomas, U.S. Congressman from Oklahoma's 6th congressional district
 Jack C. Walton, former Governor of Oklahoma, 1924 Democratic nominee for the U.S. Senate
 W. A. Ledbetter, former delegate to state constitutional convention
 Lamar Looney, State Senator
 M. L. Misenheimer, editor of the Lexington Bee

Results

Republican primary

Candidates
 John W. Harreld, incumbent U.S. Senator
 U. S. Stone, Oklahoma City oilman 
 Joe C. Fox, retired farmer 
 John A. Buckles, former Enid Postmaster 
 B. G. Bingham, farmer 
 Preston A. Shinn
 D. Lafe Hubler

Results

Socialist Primary

Candidates
 J. A. Hart

Results

Farmer–Labor Primary

Candidates
 J. Edwin Spurr

Results

General election

Results

References

Oklahoma
1926
1926 Oklahoma elections